The Iceland men's national under-16 basketball team is the national representative for Iceland in men's international under-16 basketball tournaments. They are organized and run by the Icelandic Basketball Association. They are coached by Hjalti Þór Vilhjálmsson.

The team competes at the FIBA U16 European Championship, with an chance to qualify for the FIBA Under-17 World Cup.

See also
Iceland men's national basketball team
Iceland men's national under-20 basketball team
Iceland men's national under-18 basketball team
Iceland women's national under-16 basketball team

References

External links
Official website 
FIBA profile

 
National sports teams of Iceland
Men's national under-16 basketball teams